Royal Air Force Great Massingham or more simply RAF Great Massingham is a former Royal Air Force station located  southwest of Fakenham, Norfolk and  east of King's Lynn, Norfolk, England.

The airfield was built as a satellite airfield of RAF West Raynham in 1940. The airfield closed in 1945, although remained in use for storage until the 1950s.

History

The following units were posted here at some point:
 No. 18 Squadron RAF 1940 - 41
 No. 90 Squadron RAF 1941
 No. 107 Squadron RAF 1941
 No. 342 Squadron RAF 1943
 No. 169 Squadron RAF 1944 - 45
 No. 16 Heavy Glider Maintenance Section
 No. 1482 (Bombing) Gunnery Flight
 No. 1692 (Bomber Support Training) Unit RAF
 No. 1694 (Target Towing) Flight RAF became No. 1694 Bomber (Defence) Training Flight RAF
 No. 4109 Anti-Aircraft Flight RAF Regiment
 No. 4303 Anti-Aircraft Flight RAF Regiment
 Central Fighter Establishment

Current use

The airfield was sold in 1958 and returned to agricultural use. Although the runways are still present and still used, the control tower has been demolished.

See also
 List of former Royal Air Force stations

References

Citations

Bibliography

External links
https://web.archive.org/web/20071211040927/http://www.greatmassingham.net/page8.html
Control Towers

Royal Air Force stations in Norfolk
Royal Air Force stations of World War II in the United Kingdom